Srubabati Goswami is an Indian scientist specialising in High Energy Physics, Astroparticle Physics, and Neutrino Physics .  She is the  first Indian woman to earn a Ph.D. in  neutrino oscillations from the Science College, University of Calcutta. She did her research in the PRL and Saha Institute of Nuclear Physics and later worked in the Harish Chandra Research Institute.  She is a Senior Professor in Theoretical High Energy Physics in the Physical Research Laboratory. She is a fellow of Indian Academy of Sciences, National Academy of Sciences, India and Indian National Science Academy.

References

Living people
1966 births
20th-century Indian physicists
Indian women physicists
Indian physicists
20th-century Indian women scientists